Chase Mills is a hamlet in St. Lawrence County, New York, United States. Chase Mills has a post office with ZIP code 13621, which opened on November 19, 1853.

References

Hamlets in St. Lawrence County, New York
Hamlets in New York (state)